The Commonwealth of Dominica has been operating a citizenship by investment programme since 1993, making it the second Caribbean island-nation to launch one such programme – having been preceded by the Federation of St Kitts and Nevis. The Dominica Citizenship by Investment Programme, sometimes referred to as the Dominica Economic Citizenship Programme, is framed within Section 101 of the Constitution of the Commonwealth of Dominica, the 1978 Commonwealth of Dominica Citizenship Act,  and regulations published in 2014, 2016, and 2017. Under the Programme, an investor can obtain citizenship of Dominica upon the payment of a one-time contribution to the Economic Diversification Fund, or, as of 2014, upon the purchase of an approved project – generally a real estate development – and the payment of a Government fee.

Legal basis
The Dominican Constitution mandates that Parliament provide for the acquisition of citizenship of Dominica by persons who are not, or who are no longer, otherwise entitled to such citizenship under the remaining provisions of the Constitution.

In 1978, the Citizenship Act addressed the matter of such acquisition by the granting of a naturalisation certificate, in sections eight and nine of the Act.

The regulations currently governing the Dominica Citizenship by Investment Programme are the 4. Commonwealth of Dominica Citizenship by Investment (Amendment) Regulations, 2017, the Commonwealth of Dominica Citizenship by Investment (Amendment) Regulations, 2016, and the Commonwealth of Dominica Citizenship by Investment Regulations, 2014, the latter having fully repealed previous regulations gazetted in 2013.

Operations
The Dominica Citizenship by Investment Programme is administered by the Citizenship by Investment Unit, a Government office established under section three of the 2014 Regulations. The Citizenship by Investment Unit, commonly known as the Unit or the CBIU, processes all applications for citizenship by investment, and commissions due diligence reports on each applicant.

Due diligence is performed by one or more independent professional firms, and a due diligence fee is collected for this purpose. Additionally, information on applicants is sent to the Caribbean Community (CARICOM)’s Implementing Agency for Crime and Security (IMPACS), which in turn vets applicants through Interpol and governmental databases.

The Unit is bound by regulation to determine whether an application is approved in principle, denied, or delayed for cause and still being processed within at most three months of receipt of the application, ensuring a maximum timeframe for applications.

Effects
The Dominica Citizenship by Investment Programme is directly responsible for the funding of major development work in Dominica. In his Budget Address for 2016-2017, Prime Minister Roosevelt Skerrit said “we may ask the question ‘why is the Citizenship by Investment Programme so important?’ The response is clear; in an age where development finance is dwindling and the process of gaining access to available financing is becoming more onerous, governments the world over must find credible ways and means of raising financing for development programmes. The alternative would be to increase domestic taxes and or contract loans.” Such development programmes included the Roseau Enhancement Project, infrastructural work at the Douglas Charles International Airport, and rehabilitation works in response to Tropical Storm Erika, which caused widespread damage to Dominica in August 2015. In an interview with the Huffington Post released in February 2016, Vince Henderson, then Permanent Representative of Dominica to the United Nations, characterised the Programme as a “lifeline” in the wake of the storm. Following category five Hurricane Maria, which made landfall in September 2017 and affected over 92 percent of Dominica's population, it is expected the Citizenship by Investment Programme will continue to provide sustenance and support to Dominica in its restoration efforts, as the Unit reported “business as usual” days after the hurricane.

Recognition
The Dominica Citizenship by Investment Programme has received several accolades throughout its existence. On 30 June 2016, it was awarded the title of ‘Best Caribbean Citizenship Programme’ at the Russian Global Citizen Awards. On 1 February 2017, Arton Capital's Arton Index scored Dominica second out of twelve total programmes, including both residence and citizenship by investment schemes. In June 2017, the Financial Times’ Professional Wealth Management magazine published the CBI Index, which rated Dominica's Citizenship by Investment Programme as the best in the world as compared to eleven other fully developed economic citizenship programmes

References

Economy of Dominica
Acquired citizenship